Alan George Dennis (born 22 February 1951) is an English former footballer who played in the Football League as a defender for Colchester United.

Career

Born in Colchester, Dennis began his career as a youth player at hometown club Colchester United. He made his debut as a substitute for Micky Brown in the 13th minute of a 2–0 victory against Lincoln City on 22 April 1970. He made five appearances for the U's, playing his final game for the club just under one year after his debut in a 4–0 defeat at Oldham Athletic before leaving to join Dover.

References

1951 births
Living people
Sportspeople from Colchester
English footballers
Association football defenders
Colchester United F.C. players
Dover F.C. players
English Football League players